Hostens (Gascon: Ostens) is a commune in the Gironde department in southwestern France. It is around 35 km south of Bordeaux.

Population

See also
Communes of the Gironde department
Parc naturel régional des Landes de Gascogne

References

Communes of Gironde